Coleophora christenseni is a moth of the family Coleophoridae. It is found in Greece and on Crete.

References

christenseni
Moths described in 1983
Moths of Europe